The Parkersburg Carnegie Library is a historic library building located at Parkersburg, Wood County, West Virginia.  It was designed and built in 1905, with funds provided by the philanthropist Andrew Carnegie.   It is one of 3,000 such libraries constructed between 1885 and 1919. Carnegie provided $34,000 toward the construction of the Parkersburg library.  It is a two-story, "L"-shaped brick structure in the Classical Revival style.  The facade is detailed in gray stone and features a pediment with two Doric order columns. It ceased use as a library about 1975, and in December 1985, it was re-opened, as Trans Allegheny Books, which was the largest used book store in West Virginia until it closed in 2010.

It was listed on the National Register of Historic Places in 1982.

References

Library buildings completed in 1905
Buildings and structures in Parkersburg, West Virginia
Libraries on the National Register of Historic Places in West Virginia
Neoclassical architecture in West Virginia
Carnegie libraries in West Virginia
National Register of Historic Places in Wood County, West Virginia
1905 establishments in West Virginia